Rocket Cottage is the ninth studio album by British folk rock band Steeleye Span. It was released  in 1976 by Chrysalis Records. Produced by Mike Batt, it was hoped that the album would cement the band's popular and commercial success, building on their breakthrough into the UK Top 10 with their previous album All Around My Hat and its title track, which reached #5 on the UK singles chart. By the time it was released, the sudden explosion of the British Punk scene saw audience tastes in the UK rapidly shift away from formerly popular genres like folk rock and progressive rock, and groups that previously been critical favourites, like Steeleye Span and Yes, soon found themselves being derided as "dinosaurs". Rocket Cottage did not reach the Top 40, and it was the last album recorded by the "classic" mid-seventies lineup of the group, with Peter Knight and Bob Johnson both subsequently leaving the group.

The album is perhaps the band's most rock-influenced album, with very prominent guitars and a strong rhythm section.  Some fans consider this one of the band's best efforts, pointing to strong tracks like "London", "Fighting for Strangers", "Sir James the Rose", and "Orfeo/Nathan's Reel", the first three of which became classics of the band and fan favorites.  Others, however, find the album erratic, complaining that the band's rhythm section tends to overwhelm the vocals, particularly on "Orfeo", "The Twelve Witches", and (to a lesser extent) "The Brown Girl". Oddly for an instrumental piece, "Nathan's Reel" simply fades out.  The most peculiar decision was the inclusion of an unrehearsed version of "Camptown Racetrack"; years later Maddy Prior remarked, "I can't think what we were thinking of with that." This was the band's ninth album in five years, and many feel that their exhaustion is evident.

Peter Knight has said that the band was being pressured to write and adapt music for the commercial market, which led to considerable dissatisfaction among the band members. Both he and Bob Johnson were seriously considering leaving the band, particularly because they wanted to work on a musical version of The King of Elfland's Daughter, Chrysalis Records agreed to allow them to record that album if they agreed to record 'Rocket'. Lacking any interest in the album that Knight and Johnson produced, Chrysalis made little effort to promote the album, and Knight and Johnson chose to depart the band after 'Rocket'  was released.

Personnel
Steeleye Span
Maddy Prior - vocals
Tim Hart - vocals, guitar
Bob Johnson - vocals, guitar
Rick Kemp - bass guitar, vocals
Peter Knight - violin, mandolin
Nigel Pegrum - drums

Track listing
"London" (Hart, Johnson, Kemp, Knight, Pegrum, Prior) – 4:14
"The Bosnian Hornpipes" (Traditional) – 0:57
"Orfeo/Nathan's Reel" (Hart, Johnson, Kemp, Knight, Pegrum, Prior) – 6:00
"The Twelve Witches" (Traditional) – 4:32
"The Brown Girl" (Hart, Johnson, Kemp, Knight, Pegrum, Prior) – 5:05
"Fighting for Strangers" (Traditional) – 4:25
"Sligo Maid" (Traditional) – 3:44
"Sir James the Rose" (Traditional) – 6:15
"The Drunkard" (Traditional, prefaced by Camptown Racetrack) – 7:55

References

1976 albums
Chrysalis Records albums
Steeleye Span albums
Albums produced by Mike Batt